The France Football European Team of the Year, also known as European Challenge Interclubs, was an association football award conferred by French sports magazine France Football with the sponsorship of German multinational corporation Adidas. It was held in Europe for the first time in 1968 based in men's clubs' performance in association and UEFA competitions during the last sporting season disputed, being assigned weighted scores according with the results achieved by each team, forming a virtual league.

The award was conferred annually during 23 seasons between late 1960s to late 1980s in the same ceremony which was given the European Golden Shoe to the clubs' men's leading goalscorer in the continent and, each four years, the FIFA World Cup and UEFA European Championship awards, being Adidas the main sponsor of both competitions.

The prize was officially discontinued following the Adidas decision of not renewing its commercial contract with the French publication after it awarded the 1990 winner teams in a gala held in Paris, in January 1991. Subsequently, the Germany's designs and manufacturers corporation became the main sponsor of the FIFA World Player of the Year Award, established in that year.

Roll of Honour

By club

By country

References

France Football awards
Awards established in 1968
Awards disestablished in 1991
1968 establishments in France
1991 disestablishments in France
Adidas